Helen Joyce Worboys  is a New Zealand local-body politician. She is the sixth Mayor of Manawatu, and has held the position since 2016.

Worboys has lived in the Feilding area since the age of 10. Before entering local government she was a farmer and manager of development agency Feilding Promotion. She still farms at Mount Biggs, where she currently resides.

In October 2016 Worboys was elected Mayor of Manawatu, defeating incumbent Margaret Kouvelis. She was re-elected in 2019.

References

Living people
Mayors of Manawatu
Women mayors of places in New Zealand
Year of birth missing (living people)